VTY may refer to:

 Joint Organisation of State Employees (VTY), a Finnish trade union federation
 Air Midwest (Nigeria) (ICAO: VTY), a defunct airline
 ViTALiTY (also known as VTY), a warez group
 WVTY (also known as  "92-1 VTY Country"), an American radio station
 Vistry Group (LSE: VTY), a British housebuilding company
 Virtual teletype (VTY), a command line interface, see Telnet